Karen Denise Aubert, (born December 6, 1978) also known as K.D. Rose, is an American actress, fashion model and singer. She owns her own record label, Roseland.

Early life 
Aubert was born in Shreveport, Louisiana on December 6, 1978. She describes herself as "African-American with a dash of Creole". She grew up in Riverside and Los Angeles. She attended San Diego State University, where she played on the Aztec softball team.

Career 
She was discovered working behind the make-up counter at Macy's. She has modeled for Victoria's Secret, Noxzema, Frederick's of Hollywood, Escada and many more. She co-hosted MTV's Kidnapped and has gone on to star in several films and music videos.

Aubert is also one of the four original Fantanas, a female group of spokesmodels appearing in TV commercials for the soft drink Fanta. She was the Strawberry Fanta. She is featured as the Strawberry Fantana with her fellow Fantanas in the Maxim magazine online girl gallery and was ranked #91 and #97 on the Maxim Hot 100 Women of 2003 and 2004.  Aubert was in an Old Spice commercial with Greg Jennings of the Green Bay Packers. She has also been in commercials for Bacardi, Miller Lite, Go Daddy, Beats By Dr. Dre, and Cola. Karen has just finished a commercial with George Clooney and Nespresso.

Aubert's big break came when she was cast as Donna in Friday After Next which was directed by Marcus Raboy and produced by Ice Cube. She also had two roles in Hollywood Homicide. She also starred in DysEnchanted as Little Red Riding Hood with Jim Belushi. She played Giselle in Soul Plane. She also played Eliza in Frankenfish. In 2005, Aubert played Cherise in In the Mix. In 2007, Aubert was cast as Julie the Waitress in The Grand. In 2008, Aubert played April May in Surfer, Dude. In 2013, Aubert was nominated and won an Africa Movie Academy Award for her role in Turning Point, as well as the Turning Point cast who also won several awards at the 9th Africa Movie Academy Awards AMAA. In 2018, Aubert was cast in a film called She Ball, directed by Nick Cannon.

Filmography

Film

Television

Music videos

Video game appearances

References

External links 
 
 

Female models from Louisiana
American television actresses
San Diego State University alumni
Living people
African-American actresses
American film actresses
African-American female models
American female models
African-American models
Actors from Shreveport, Louisiana
American people of Creole descent
21st-century African-American people
21st-century African-American women
1978 births